The 521st Air Mobility Operations Group (521 AMOG) is a United States Air Force Air Mobility Command (AMC) unit stationed at Naval Station Rota, Spain. The 521st AMOG is subordinate to the 521st Air Mobility Operations Wing at Ramstein Air Base, Germany. The group and its subordinate units provide en route support for transient aircraft as part of its parent wing.

Assigned units
 5th Expeditionary Air Mobility Squadron (5 EAMS) (Cargo City, Kuwait)
 8th Expeditionary Air Mobility Squadron (8 EAMS) (Al Udeid Air Base, Qatar)
 725th Air Mobility Squadron (725 AMS) (Naval Station Rota, Spain)
 728th Air Mobility Squadron (728 AMS) (Incirlik Air Base, Turkey)

Lineage
 Constituted as the 521st Air Mobility Operations Group on 19 August 2008
 Activated on 4 September 2008

Assignments
 521st Air Mobility Operations Wing, 4 September 2008 – present

Stations

 Naval Station Rota, Spain, 4 September 2008 – present

References 

Groups of the United States Air Force